N. L. Dalmia Institute of Management Studies and Research (NLDIMSR) is a business school situated in Mira Road, Mumbai, Maharashtra.  It was formed under the aegis of the N. L. Dalmia Educational Society, founded by late Shri Niranjanlal Dalmia.

Established in 1995, N. L. Dalmia commenced its academic programme in July 1997, offering the Master's in Management Studies (MMS), a two-year full-time course affiliated to the University of Mumbai, the Post Graduate Diploma in Business Management, a three-year part-time course approved by AICTE which is available in both full-time and part-time presentations. The Institute provides specialisation in areas such as Finance, Marketing, Human Resources, and Business Systems, and special extra credit courses including FMI, Wealth Management, ERP, and Software Engineering. Other courses are added by the Institute in response to changing corporate requirements. From 2020 onwards, the college has decided to take admissions only for Post Graduate Diploma in Business Management for a two-year full-time course.

Bloomberg Lab Mumbai's first and amongst very few in India, N. L. Dalmia Institute of Management Studies and Research has set up Mumbai's first Bloomberg Finance Lab with 12 Bloomberg Terminals. By bringing the Bloomberg Professional Service to campus, the world's foremost information platform, the institute is now part of a select group of Institutions in India, and Mumbai's first institution to have such world class infrastructure. This resource is shared by top educational institutions worldwide.
The Marketing specialization of this institute has been improving over the past few years to attract big recruiters like Hindustan Unilever Ltd, Procter and Gamble etc.

Placement Record: Average Salary of Rs. 7-9 Lacs for year 2017–18.

Rankings
 Ranked amongst India's Top 25 B-Schools in Times Bschool Survey
 Ranked amongst India's TOP 50 B-Schools in CNBC TV18's 2013 Survey
 Ranked Amongst India's top 25 B Schools by Zee Business and The Pioneer Newspaper (2011)
 Ranked Amongst India's top 30 B Schools by Hindustan Times 2011.
 Ranked amongst India's Top 25 Business School Brands by TNS Mode - Business Barons Survey in Feb 2007.
 Ranked amongst India's Top 40 Business Schools by OUTLOOK Magazine in year 2004,05 and 2006.
 Ranked amongst India's Top 45 Business Schools by Competition Success Review in 2006.
 Ranked Amongst India's TOP 30 B-School by ZEE BUSINESS NEWS Channel – Nov 2009 
 Ranked Amongst India's TOP 24 B-School by ZEE BUSINESS NEWS Channel – 2010
 Ranked amongst Top 10 B school in Mumbai by CMAT club

Courses
• Master's degree in Management Studies
• Master's degree in Marketing Management
• Master's degree in Financial Management
• Master's degree in Human Resources Management
• Post Graduate Diploma in Business Management
• PhD in Management
• PGDM in Finance
• PGDM in Marketing
• PGDM in HR
• Global MBA Program

References

 MCX signs an MoU with NL Dalmia Institute for financial literacy among students

External links 
 Official NLDIMSR website

Business schools in Mumbai
University of Mumbai
Education in Mira-Bhayandar
Educational institutions established in 1995
1995 establishments in Maharashtra